Ministry of Labor and Employment or Ministry of Labour and Employment may refer to:

 Ministry of Labour and Employment (Bangladesh)
 Ministry of Labor and Employment (Brazil)
 Ministry of Labour and Employment (India)
 Department of Labor and Employment (Philippines)
 Ministry of Labour and Employment (Tanzania)